The Chinese men's national under-20 ice hockey team is the national under-20 ice hockey team in China. The team represents China at the International Ice Hockey Federation's World Junior Hockey Championship Division III.

Junior national ice hockey teams
Ice hockey